Raymond Steegmans (born 15 May 1945 in Hasselt) is a former Belgian cyclist. Professional from 1966 to 1974, he won the points classification and two stages of the 1969 Vuelta a España.

Major results
1967
 3rd Brussels–Ingooigem
1969
 Vuelta a España
1st  Points classification
1st Stages 5 & 14
1972
 1st Grote 1-MeiPrijs
 1st Stage 4B Tour de la Nouvelle France
1973
 4th Le Samyn
1974
 3rd Omloop der Vlaamse Ardennen

References

1945 births
Living people
Belgian male cyclists
Sportspeople from Hasselt
Cyclists from Limburg (Belgium)
20th-century Belgian people